FoldX is a protein design algorithm that uses an empirical force field.  It can determine the energetic effect of point mutations as well as the interaction energy of protein complexes (including Protein-DNA). FoldX can mutate protein and DNA side chains using a probability-based rotamer library, while exploring alternative conformations of the surrounding side chains.

Applications 
 Prediction of the effect of point mutations or human SNPs on protein stability or protein complexes
 Protein design to improve stability or modify affinity or specificity
 Homology modeling

The FoldX force field 
The energy function includes terms that have been found to be important for protein stability, where the energy of unfolding (∆G) of a target protein is calculated using the equation:

∆G = ∆Gvdw + ∆GsolvH + ∆GsolvP + ∆Ghbond + ∆Gwb + ∆Gel + ∆Smc + ∆Ssc
 
Where ∆Gvdw is the sum of the Van der Waals contributions of all atoms with respect to the same interactions with the solvent. ∆GsolvH and ∆GsolvP is the difference in solvation energy for apolar and polar groups, respectively, when going from the unfolded to the folded state. ∆Ghbond is the free energy difference between the formation of an intra-molecular hydrogen-bond compared to inter-molecular hydrogen-bond formation (with solvent). ∆Gwb is the extra stabilizing free energy provided by a water molecule making more than one hydrogen-bond to the protein (water bridges) that cannot be taken into account with non-explicit solvent approximations. ∆Gel is the electrostatic contribution of charged groups, including the helix dipole.  ∆Smc is the entropy cost for fixing the backbone in the folded state. This term is dependent on the intrinsic tendency of a particular amino acid to adopt certain dihedral angles. ∆Ssc is the entropic cost of fixing a side chain in a particular conformation. The energy values of ∆Gvdw, ∆GsolvH, ∆GsolvP and ∆Ghbond attributed to each atom type have been derived from a set of experimental data, and ∆Smc and ∆Ssc have been taken from theoretical estimates. The Van der Waals contributions are derived from vapor to water energy transfer, while in the protein we are going from solvent to protein.

For protein-protein interactions, or protein-DNA interactions  FoldX calculates ∆∆G of interaction :

∆∆Gab = ∆Gab- (∆Ga + ∆Gb) + ∆Gkon + ∆Ssc

∆Gkon reflects the effect of electrostatic interactions on the kon. ∆Ssc is the loss of translational and rotational entropy upon making the complex.

Key features 
 RepairPDB: energy minimization of a protein structure
 BuildModel: in silico mutagenesis or homology modeling with predicted energy changes
 AnalyseComplex: interaction energy calculation
 Stability: prediction of free energy changes between alternative structures
 AlaScan: in silico alanine scan of a protein structure with predicted energy changes
 SequenceDetail: per residue free energy decomposition into separate energy terms (hydrogen bonding, Van der Waals energy, electrostatics, ...)

Graphical interface 
Native FoldX is run from the command line. A FoldX plugin for the YASARA molecular graphics program has been developed to access various FoldX tools inside a graphical environment. The results of e.g. in silico mutations or homology modeling with FoldX can be directly analyzed on screen.

Molecule Parametrization 
In version 5.0, the possibility to parametrize previously not recognized molecules in JSON format was added into the software.

Further reading

External links
 http://foldx.crg.es FoldX website
 http://foldxyasara.switchlab.org FoldX plugin for YASARA

Molecular modelling software